Guy Buchaille (born 20 August 1932) is a French racing cyclist. He was a professional rider from 1952 to 1958. He rode in the 1953 Tour de France.

References

External links
 

1932 births
Living people
French male cyclists
Place of birth missing (living people)